Irene Joseph (born 14 October 1981) is an Indonesian sprinter. She competed in the women's 100 metres at the 2000 Summer Olympics.

References

1981 births
Living people
Athletes (track and field) at the 2000 Summer Olympics
Indonesian female sprinters
Olympic athletes of Indonesia
Southeast Asian Games medalists in athletics
Sportspeople from Maluku (province)
Southeast Asian Games silver medalists for Indonesia
Southeast Asian Games bronze medalists for Indonesia
Competitors at the 2007 Southeast Asian Games
Olympic female sprinters
21st-century Indonesian women